Tango with Me is a 2010 Nigerian romantic drama film written by Femi Kayode, produced and directed by Mahmood Ali-Balogun and starring Genevieve Nnaji, Joseph Benjamin and Joke Silva. The film was nominated for 5 awards at the 7th Africa Movie Academy Awards.

Cast
Genevieve Nnaji as Lola
Joke Silva as Lola's mum
Joseph Benjamin as Uzo
Tina Mba
Bimbo Manuel as Counsellor
Ahmed Yerima
Bimbo Akintola

Reception
The film received positive to mixed reviews from critics. NollywoodForever gave it 80% and wrote "Tango with Me is beautifully shot with a soundtrack to complement. Joseph and Genny look good together and have an easy chemistry. I did find it somewhat slow in parts but the performances were passionate and heartfelt".

See also
 List of Nigerian films of 2010

References

External links
 
 

2010 films
English-language Nigerian films
2010 romantic drama films
Nigerian romantic drama films
2010s English-language films